Boman at the Exhibition (Swedish: Boman på utställningen) is a 1923 Swedish silent comedy film directed by Karin Swanström and starring Swanström, Georg Blomstedt, Wiktor Andersson and Ingeborg Strandin. It was shot at the Råsunda Studios in Stockholm and on location in Gothenburg. The film's sets were designed by the art director Vilhelm Bryde.

Cast
 Karin Swanström as Mrs. Sjöborg
 Georg Blomstedt as 	Boman
 Wiktor Andersson as 	Emanuel Göransson
 Ingeborg Strandin as 	Eulalia Göransson
 Harald Adelsohn as 	Adelsohn
 lsa Adenius as 	Ada
 Vilhelm Berndtson as 	Butler
 Gösta Björkman as 	Mailman
 Rudolf Bohman as 	Kålle
 Torre Cederborg as 	Elander
 Valdemar Ekegård as 	Ekegård
 Josef Fischer as 	Uncle Jörgen
 Karin Gardtman as 	Karin Sjöborg
 Carl Hagman as 	Persson
 Ann-Marie Kjellgren as 	Brita
 Nils Vilhelm Lund as 	Shoeshine
 Frans Pfunkenhofer as 	Johan Sjöborg

References

Bibliography
 Gustafsson, Tommy. Masculinity in the Golden Age of Swedish Cinema: A Cultural Analysis of 1920s Films. McFarland, 2014.
 Wallengren, Ann-Kristin.  Welcome Home Mr Swanson: Swedish Emigrants and Swedishness on Film. Nordic Academic Press, 2014.
 Wredlund, Bertil. Långfilm i Sverige: 1920-1929. Proprius, 1987.

External links

1923 films
1923 comedy films
Swedish comedy films
Swedish silent feature films
Swedish black-and-white films
Films directed by Karin Swanström
1920s Swedish-language films
Silent comedy films
1920s Swedish films

sv:Boman på utställningen